Kill The Scientist (also known as The Band Formerly Known as Kill The Scientist) was an experimental music, performance art and sound collage band. The group created music from 1989 until 2003. The group was heavily influenced by Negativland, Crass and Skinny Puppy. In 2003 the band finished their first full-length album before parting ways, but instead of shelving the album they put it up on their official website for free download.

Before disbanding however, the band played shows in art galleries, dorm rooms, and the like spreading their performance art bug into the formation of newer and greater bands.

Discography
We're Not Generation X comp - 1999
You Call This Music?! Volume 1 comp - 2000
Your Machinery is Too Much For Me four band split 7-inch - 2001
You Call This Music?! Volume 2 comp - 2002
Dropping Food On Their Heads is Not Enough: Benefit For RAWA comp - 2002
Fall of Mankind (Full-length album free for download on their official website) - 2003
Chemical X DVD Music Video Compilation - 2008

Reviews
Your Machinery Is Too Much For Me Four Band split 7-inch reviews-

This is a good strange 7" comp. It features Intro5pect with a techno/77 punk type song, two catchy melodic songs from ESL, a song called "Hitler in the Toy Store" by No Erasers Allowed, and some noisy crazy weird noises from KTS. Inside are lyrics and a well written article dealing with the theme. Oh yeah, it's also on blue vinyl! So whether it be for the music, the blue vinyl, or to warp your mind…Get this!
(Adam) PUNKROCKLOVE, Issue #4, July 2001

A mix bag on this 4 band 7". Intro5pect plays straight up melodic punk. No Erasers Allowed do the forgettable punk thing. Kill the Scientist definitely have more than one later-era Vinyl Communication release in their collection. Finally ESL play some kick ass punk reminiscent of some bay area stuff from the early 1990s, complete with great lyrics. Worth the cash for the ESL songs.
MAXIMUMROCKNROLL, Issue #17, June 2001

Intro5pect has a track on here, so I was already into it. They play a different version of a song off their A-F Records album that features their rapid drum machine beats with punk rock music. It's great. The other bands are No Erasers Allowed, Kill The Scientists and ESL. I really liked ESL's pop-punk tracks and found myself wanting to hear more of them.
(CM) IMPACT PRESS, October/November 2003

Anarcho-hardcore concept release featuring Introspect, Kill the Scientist, ESL and no Erasers Allowed. The sound collage opening of Introspect's "See the End" is better than any of the songs, which turn out to be standard mid-tempo riff-rock. The theme is: corporate greed and technology feeds the machinery of destruction and vice versa, which in turn east away at our souls, destroying us as humans. A self-fulfilling prophecy. Baudrillard's already been there; thumbs up for trying. Keep on keepin' on.
(Anthony) SHREDDING PAPER, Issue #10, September 2001

External links
Official site
GC Records
Free Full length album

Geykido Comet Records